So Beast is the first Japanese album from the South Korean boy group Beast. It was released in Japan on August 10, 2011 in 3 formats: A CD+DVD A coming with DVD, 72-page photobook, 22-page lyric booklet and comes in a digipak with a sleeve over it, CD+DVD B comes with a DVD with different contents and a 32-page photobook and CD only just featuring a lyric booklet and its CD. It contain 12 tracks, some tracks in Korean and some tracks are Japanese versions from their previously released albums. It ranked no. 3 in Oricon's Weekly albums chart with 50,819 copies sold in the first week.

Composition
The album includes Japanese versions of songs which were previously released in Korean. Most notably, "Fiction" and "Fiction (Orchestra Version)" from their first full album "Fiction and Fact", "Mystery" on the EP "Beast Is the B2ST" and also their first two Japanese singles "Shock" and "Bad Girl". It also includes a few Korean songs.

Singles
The first single from the album (and also their debut in Japan) is a Japanese version of the song "Shock". It was released on March 16, 2011, and ranked no. 2 in Oricon's Weekly chart. It sold more than 56,000 copies.

The second single from the album is a Japanese version of the song "Bad Girl", which is also their debut single in South Korea. It was released on June 15, 2011, and ranked no. 3 in Oricon's Weekly chart. At the date, sold more than 50,000 copies.

Track listing

The song "Rainbow" is a Korean remake of the song "Niji" by Masaharu Fukuyama.

Charts

Weekly charts

Year-end charts

Release history

References

External links
 
 

2011 albums
J-pop albums
Highlight (band) albums
Japanese-language albums
Universal Records albums